In computer vision, the essential matrix is a  matrix,  that relates corresponding points in stereo images assuming that the cameras satisfy the pinhole camera model.

Function

if  and  correspond to the same 3D point in the scene.

The above relation which defines the essential matrix was published in 1981 by H. Christopher Longuet-Higgins, introducing the concept to the computer vision community. Richard Hartley and Andrew Zisserman's book reports that an analogous matrix appeared in photogrammetry long before that. Longuet-Higgins' paper includes an algorithm for estimating  from a set of corresponding normalized image coordinates as well as an algorithm for determining the relative position and orientation of the two cameras given that  is known. Finally, it shows how the 3D coordinates of the image points can be determined with the aid of the essential matrix.

Use
The essential matrix can be seen as a precursor to the fundamental matrix, . Both matrices can be used for establishing constraints between matching image points, but the fundamental matrix can only be used in relation to calibrated cameras since the inner camera parameters (matrices  and ) must be known in order to achieve the normalization. If, however, the cameras are calibrated the essential matrix can be useful for determining both the relative position and orientation between the cameras and the 3D position of corresponding image points. The essential matrix is related to the fundamental matrix with

Derivation and definition 
This derivation follows the paper by Longuet-Higgins.

Two normalized cameras project the 3D world onto their respective image planes. Let the 3D coordinates of a point P be  and  relative to each camera's coordinate system. Since the cameras are normalized, the corresponding image coordinates are

   and   

A homogeneous representation of the two image coordinates is then given by

   and   

which also can be written more compactly as

    and   

Another consequence of the normalized cameras is that their respective coordinate systems are related by means of a translation and rotation. This implies that the two sets of 3D coordinates are related as

The essential matrix is then defined as:

{| style="font-size:120%; border:3px dashed red;" cellpadding="8"
|-
|
|}

Note: Here, the transformation  will transform points in the 2nd view to the 1st view.

For the definition of  we are only interested in the orientations of the normalized image coordinates  (See also: Triple product).
As such we don't need the translational component when substituting image coordinates into the essential equation.
To see that this definition of  describes a constraint on corresponding image coordinates multiply  from left and right with the 3D coordinates of point P in the two different coordinate systems:

 

  since  is a rotation matrix.
 Properties of the matrix representation of the cross product.

This gives

which is the constraint that the essential matrix defines between corresponding image points.

Properties 
Not every arbitrary  matrix can be an essential matrix for some stereo cameras. To see this notice that it is defined as the matrix product of one rotation matrix and one skew-symmetric matrix, both .  The skew-symmetric matrix must have two singular values which are equal and another which is zero.  The multiplication of the rotation matrix does not change the singular values which means that also the essential matrix has two singular values which are equal and one which is zero.  The properties described here are sometimes referred to as internal constraints of the essential matrix.

If the essential matrix  is multiplied by a non-zero scalar, the result is again an essential matrix which defines exactly the same constraint as  does.  This means that  can be seen as an element of a projective space, that is, two such matrices are considered equivalent if one is a non-zero scalar multiplication of the other.  This is a relevant position, for example, if  is estimated from image data. However, it is also possible to take the position that  is defined as

 

where , and then  has a well-defined "scaling". It depends on the application which position is the more relevant.

The constraints can also be expressed as
 
and 
 
Here, the last equation is a matrix constraint, which can be seen as 9 constraints, one for each matrix element. 
These constraints are often used for determining the essential matrix from five corresponding point pairs.

The essential matrix has five or six degrees of freedom, depending on whether or not it is seen as a projective element. The rotation matrix  and the translation vector  have three degrees of freedom each, in total six. If the essential matrix is considered as a projective element, however, one degree of freedom related to scalar multiplication must be subtracted leaving five degrees of freedom in total.

Estimation 

Given a set of corresponding image points it is possible to estimate an essential matrix which satisfies the defining epipolar constraint for all the points in the set.  However, if the image points are subject to noise, which is the common case in any practical situation, it is not possible to find an essential matrix which satisfies all constraints exactly.

Depending on how the error related to each constraint is measured, it is possible to determine or estimate an essential matrix which optimally satisfies the constraints for a given set of corresponding image points.  The most straightforward approach is to set up a total least squares problem, commonly known as the eight-point algorithm.

Extracting rotation and translation 

Given that the essential matrix has been determined for a stereo camera pair -- for example, using the estimation method above -- this information can be used for determining also the rotation  and translation  (up to a scaling) between the two camera's coordinate systems. In these derivations  is seen as a projective element rather than having a well-determined scaling.

Finding one solution 
It is also possible to determine  and  without an SVD, for example, following Longuet-Higgins' paper.

An SVD of  gives

Define

   with   

and make the following ansatz

Since  may not completely fulfill the constraints when dealing with real world data (f.e. camera images), the alternative

   with   

may help.

Proof 

Since

it is the case that  is skew-symmetric, i.e., . This is also the case for our , since

According to the general properties of the matrix representation of the cross product it then follows that  must be the cross product operator of exactly one vector .

To be a proper rotation matrix it must also satisfy . Since, in this case,  is seen as a projective element this can be accomplished by reversing the sign of  if necessary.

Finding all solutions 
It is, however, not the only possible solution and it may not even be a valid solution from a practical point of view. It must lie in the null space of  since

For the translation vector this only causes a change of sign, which has already been described as a possibility. For the rotation, on the other hand, this will produce a different transformation, at least in the general case.

In total this gives four classes of solutions for the rotation and translation between the two camera coordinate systems. On top of that, there is also an unknown scaling  for the chosen translation direction.

It turns out, however, that only one of the four classes of solutions can be realized in practice. Given a pair of corresponding image coordinates, three of the solutions will always produce a 3D point which lies behind at least one of the two cameras and therefore cannot be seen. Only one of the four classes will consistently produce 3D points which are in front of both cameras. This must then be the correct solution. Still, however, it has an undetermined positive scaling related to the translation component.

If this is not the case which, for example, typically is the case if  has been estimated from real (and noisy) image data, it has to be assumed that it approximately satisfy the internal constraints. The vector  is then chosen as right singular vector of  corresponding to the smallest singular value.

3D points from corresponding image points 

See also 
 Bundle adjustment
 Epipolar geometry
 Fundamental matrix
 Geometric camera calibration
 Triangulation (computer vision)
 Trifocal tensor

Toolboxes 
Essential Matrix Estimation in MATLAB (Manolis Lourakis).

External links 
An Investigation of the Essential Matrix by R.I. Hartley

References 

 
 
 
 
 
 

Geometry in computer vision